Woe from Wit (also translated as "The Woes of Wit", "Wit Works Woe", Wit's End, and so forth) is Alexander Griboyedov's comedy in verse, satirizing the society of post-Napoleonic Moscow, or, as a high official in the play styled it, "a pasquinade on Moscow."

The play, written in 1823 in the countryside and in Tiflis, was not passed by the censors for the stage, and only portions of it were allowed to appear in an almanac for 1825. But it was read out by the author to "all Moscow" and to "all Petersburg" and circulated in innumerable copies, so it was as good as published in 1825; it was not, however, actually published until 1833, after the author's death, with significant cuts, and was not published in full until 1861.
The play was a compulsory work in Russian literature lessons in Soviet schools, and is still considered a golden classic in modern Russia and other minority Russian-speaking countries.

The play gave rise to numerous catchphrases in the Russian language, including the title itself.

Language
The play belongs to the classical school of comedy, with principal antecedents in Molière. Like Denis Fonvizin before him and like the founders of the Russian realistic tradition after him, Griboyedov lays far greater stress on the characters and their dialogue than on his plot. The comedy is loosely constructed but in the dialogue and in the character drawing Griboyedov is supreme and unique.

The dialogue is in rhymed verse, in iambic lines of variable length, a meter that was introduced into Russia by the fabulists as the equivalent of La Fontaine's vers libre and that had reached a high degree of perfection in the hands of Ivan Krylov. Griboyedov's dialogue is a continuous tour de force. It always attempts and achieves the impossible: the squeezing of everyday conversation into a rebellious metrical form.

Griboyedov seemed to multiply his difficulties on purpose. He was, for instance, alone of his time to use unexpected, sonorous, punning rhymes. There is just enough toughness and angularity in his verse to constantly remind the reader of the pains undergone and the difficulties triumphantly overcome by the poet. Despite the fetters of the metrical form, Griboyedov's dialogue has the natural rhythm of conversation and is more easily colloquial than any prose. It is full of wit, variety, and character, and is a veritable encyclopedia of the best spoken Russian of the period. Almost every other line of the comedy has become part of the language and proverbs from Griboyedov are as numerous as proverbs from Krylov. For epigram, repartee, terse and concise wit, Griboyedov has no rivals in Russian.

Characters

Griboyedov's characters, while typical of the period, are moulded from the really common clay of humanity. They all, down to the most episodic characters, have the same perfection of finish and clearness of outline.

Pavel Afanasyevich Famusov, the father, the head of an important department, the natural conservative, the cynical and placid philosopher of good digestion, the pillar of stable society;
Sofia Pavlovna, his daughter, the heroine neither idealized nor caricatured, with a strange, drily romantic flavour. With her fixity of purpose, her ready wit, and her deep, but reticent, passionateness, she is the principal active force in the play and the plot is advanced mainly by her actions.
Liza, Sofia's maid, the headstrong and powerless maid. She boldly speaks her mind as she is unable to take action given her gender and station. She is a vehicle through which multiple characters expose their baser desires and reveal truths fiercely protected in public.
Alexey Stepanovich Molchalin, Famusov's secretary living in his house, the sneak who plays whist with old ladies, pets their dogs, and acts the lover to his patron's daughter;
Alexandr Andreyevich Chatsky, the protagonist. Sometimes irrelevantly eloquent, he leads a generous, if vague, revolt against the vegetable-like selfish world of Famusovs and Molchalins. His exhilarating, youthful idealism, his go, his élan is of the family of Romeo. Tradition tells that the character is modeled after Pyotr Chaadaev, an original and controversial Russian writer and philosopher, with whom Griboyedov was acquainted. It is significant that, in spite of all his apparent lack of clear-cut personality, his part is the traditional touchstone for a Russian actor. Great Chatskys are as rare and as highly valued in Russia as are great Hamlets in Britain.
Colonel Skalozub, Sergey Sergeyevich
The Goriches:
Natalia Dmitriyevna, young lady
Platon Mikhailovich, her husband
Count Tugoukhovsky
Countess, his wife, and six daughters
The Khryuminas:
Countess Khryumina, the grandmother
Countess Khryumina, the granddaughter
Anton Antonovich Zagoretsky
Old woman Khlyostova, Famusov's sister-in-law
Mr. N.
Mr. D.
Repetilov, the Anglomaniac orator of the coffee room and of the club, burning for freedom and stinking of liquor, the witless admirer of wit, and the bosom friend of all his acquaintances;
Petrushka and several speaking footmen;
A large number of guests of all ranks and their footmen engaged during their departure;
Famusov's waiters.

A number of the characters have names that go a long way toward describing their personality.
Famusov's surname is derived from Latin fama, meaning "public opinion" or "repute", which is a matter of great importance to that character, while his name stands for "small" as in unremarkable and his patronymic is derived from Afanasy ("immortal").
His daughter's given name is Sofia ("wise"), alluding to her pragmatism.
"Chatsky", in addition to its reference to a contemporary figure, is also considered a bilingual reference, both to the English "chat" and the Russian чадить ("to emit smoke"), alluding to the inconsequential nature of Chatsky's extensive diatribes.
Molchalin's name comes from the verb molchat''', to be silent, and he is a character of few words. Tugoukhovsky's name comes from the compound word tugoukhiy, a slang equivalent of the English phrase "hard of hearing".
Skalozub's name is an inversion of the Russian zuboskal, a mocker or jokester (literally, "one who bares teeth a lot").

Mentions elsewhere
From Anton Chekhov's A Dreary Story from the notebook of an old man  'If no progress can be seen in trifles, I should look for it in vain
in what is more important.  When an actor wrapped from head to foot in
stage traditions and conventions tries to recite a simple ordinary
speech, "To be or not to be," not simply, but invariably with the
accompaniment of hissing and convulsive movements all over his body,
or when he tries to convince me at all costs that Tchatsky, who talks
so much with fools and is so fond of folly, is a very clever man, and
that "Woe from Wit" is not a dull play, the stage gives me the same
feeling of conventionality which bored me so much forty years ago when
I was regaled with the classical howling and beating on the breast.'

Dostoevsky's "The Brothers Karamazov" refers to the play as "Sorrow from Wit".

From Mikhail Bulgakov's  The Master and Margarita'' Chapter 5.

References

Maria Sergeyevna Durnovo (Griboyedova)

External links

Горе от ума – full text with illustrations in Russian at Stixiya
Горе от ума – full text in Russian
Горе от ума – full text in Russian at Alexei Komarov's Internet Library
  
Gore ot ouma: A Comedy – full text of English translation by Nicholas Benardaky, 1857
 The Woes of Wit – full text of English translation by A. Vagapov, 1993
The Woes of Wit – Alan Shaw's translator's introduction

1823 plays
Russian plays
Comedy plays
Works published posthumously